Daniel Grimaldi, PhD (born March 7, 1946) is an American actor and mathematics professor who is known for his roles as twins Philly and Patsy Parisi on the HBO television series The Sopranos, various characters on Law & Order (1991-2001), Don't Go in the House (1979), The Junkman (1983), Men of Respect (1990), and The Yards (2000).

Career
In addition to his role on The Sopranos, he has also had some minor film credits, most notably as mother-fixated pyromaniac Donny Kohler in the 1980 slasher film Don't Go in the House, and some guest TV appearances, including several episodes on Law & Order as well as appearing in 2011 as Tommy Barrone Sr. in "Moonlighting", the 9th episode of the 2nd season of the CBS show Blue Bloods. He appeared as an executive in the 2000 film The Yards and Grimaldi also voices "Frank" for the bestselling computer game Mafia.

Education
Grimaldi has a bachelor's degree in mathematics from Fordham University, a master's degree in operations research from New York University, and a PhD in data processing from the City University of New York, and teaches in the Department of Mathematics and Computer Science at Kingsborough Community College in Brooklyn, New York.

Filmography

Film

Television

Video games

References

External links

HBO.com

1946 births
Living people
American male television actors
American male voice actors
Graduate Center, CUNY alumni
Fordham University alumni
American people of Italian descent
Mathematics educators
Male actors from New York City
New York University alumni
American operations researchers